Relations between Uganda and the People's Republic of China were established in 1962. Trade between the two nations totaled over $1 billion in 2017. Additionally, Chinese companies have contributed significantly to the building of infrastructure in Uganda. China also owns about 20% of Uganda's debt, equivalent to about $1.6 billion.

Diplomatic history
Since Uganda's independence in 1962, diplomatic relationships have existed between the two nations. China was one of the first nations to recognize the newly independent nation. In 1971, Uganda was one of 76 nations that voted in favor of Resolution 2758 restoring UN membership to the Chinese government. Following Yoweri Museveni's rise to power in 1986, the two nations have developed closer ties. The two nations have signed multiple cultural cooperation agreements, exchanging student and medical teams. Relationships between the two nations have been strengthened by a policy of non-interference in political affairs. Following the passage of the Uganda Anti-Homosexuality Act, 2014, Western criticism of the Ugandan government and Museveni's presidency increased. Many nations withdrew economic aid and support. China's policy of political non-involvement allowed them to take on the role of supplying aid and infrastructure to Uganda.

, the Ugandan ambassador to China is Crispus Kiyonga.

Economic relations
Trade between China and Uganda has also increased under Museveni's presidency. Even within the last 10 years, the amount of trade between the two nations has more than quadrupled, from around $230 million in 2008 to over $1 billion in 2018. The majority of this trade is Chinese exports to Uganda, which account for about $850 million in trade. China's largest exports are machinery and electrical equipment. Uganda's major exports to China include many raw goods such as hides, oils, and seeds.

Additionally, Uganda has emerged as a potential market for many Chinese businesses, both state-owned and private. These businesses include oil and construction, as well as smaller stores and factories for electronics, clothes, and other consumer goods.

Infrastructure and debt

China and Chinese companies have also contributed to many infrastructure projects in Uganda. Chinese construction companies have won contracts for many major infrastructure projects, such as the Mandela National Stadium and the country's largest hydroelectric dam at Karuma Falls. More recently, Chinese companies are in charge of the construction of an express highway connecting the major city of Entebbe to the capital, Kampala. The Ugandan government also utilizes Chinese technology for small and large- scale agribusiness projects, with over 40 Chinese agricultural scientists having taken part in planning these projects in Uganda since 2012.

Public opinion in Uganda
Opinions vary in Uganda on the role China plays in the local economy. According to a 2015 survey by Afrobarometer, 58% of Ugandans believe China has a positive influence on Uganda, compared to only 7% saying negative. The largest positives of China's influence were China's investment in infrastructure, China's business investment, and the cost of Chinese products. By far the largest source of negative opinion was the quality of Chinese products. Public opinion of Chinese influence has improved in China since 2010. 

Ugandan business owners have expressed opposition to Chinese influence in the country. Shopkeepers and creators of local goods have difficulty competing with the price of Chinese exports. In addition, local construction companies introduced a bill that would force the national government to prioritize local construction companies in the completion of government projects. This bill was vetoed, with MPs citing the inability of Ugandan construction companies to handle the scale of large infrastructure projects. Some Chinese business, particularly smaller private businesses, have also felt the effect of increased regulation and scrutiny from local government officials. 

Research on relations between the two nations and cultures found that the major sources of animosity between the two nations include China's state-capitalism model and Ugandans' experiences with Chinese shopkeepers and employers who may harbor racial bias.

Incidents
In 2014, China sentenced two Ugandans to death for drug trafficking in Guangdong province. Although the Ugandan government claimed that the incidents did not impact diplomatic relationships between the two nations, many Ugandan citizens and MPs were angered by the perceived violation of sovereignty and human rights.

In 2018, many Chinese businesses in Ugandan industrial parks were vandalized and robbed, prompting President Museveni to increase security presence in these regions.

On 22 February 2019, the Chinese ambassador to Uganda Zheng Zhuqiang officiated the 1st graduation of Metropolitan International University in Kisoro District, Uganda.

References

 
Uganda
Uganda
Bilateral relations of Uganda